Antti Rissanen (born 28 April 1931) is a Finnish former sports shooter. He competed in the 300 metre rifle event at the 1964 Summer Olympics.

References

External links
 

1931 births
Living people
People from Tuusniemi
Finnish male sport shooters
Olympic shooters of Finland
Shooters at the 1964 Summer Olympics
Sportspeople from North Savo